The 2015–16 Egyptian Premier League was the 57th season of the Egyptian Premier League, the top Egyptian professional league for association football clubs, since its establishment in 1948. The fixtures were announced on 20 September 2015. The season began on 20 October 2015 and concluded on 9 July 2016.

Zamalek began the season as defending champions of the 2014–15 season. Aswan, El Entag El Harby and Ghazl El Mahalla entered as the three promoted teams from the 2014–15 Egyptian Second Division.

On 24 June 2016, Al Ahly won the title with two games to spare after a 2–1 away win over Ismaily to secure their 38th Egyptian Premier League title.

Teams

Unlike the previous season, a total of 18 teams will contest the league, including 15 sides from the 2014–15 season and 3 promoted from the Egyptian Second Division.

Stadium and location

1 Al Masry's original stadium is Port Said Stadium in Port Said, but due to the Port Said Stadium riot in 2012 the Egyptian Football Association banned Al Masry from playing matches at Port Said Stadium until the end of the 2015–16 season, and instead they will play at Ismailia Stadium.

Managerial changes

Results

League table

Result table

Season statistics

Top goalscorers

Hat-tricks

Clean Sheets 

Source: yallakora

Team's progress

References

1
2015–16 in Egyptian football
Egypt